Lorne Valley was a municipality that held community status in Prince Edward Island, Canada. It was incorporated in 1978. On September 28, 2018, it was combined with six other municipalities to create the town of Three Rivers.

See also 
List of communities in Prince Edward Island

References 

Communities in Kings County, Prince Edward Island
Former rural municipalities in Prince Edward Island
Populated places disestablished in 2018